The 2017 Northern Colorado Bears football team represented the University of Northern Colorado in the 2017 NCAA Division I FCS football season. They were led by seventh-year head coach Earnest Collins Jr. and played their home games at Nottingham Field. They were a member of the Big Sky Conference. They finished the season 3–7, 2–6 in Big Sky play to finish in a three-way tie for ninth place.

Schedule

The game between Florida and Northern Colorado, recently had been rescheduled in advance of the arrival of Hurricane Irma, but on September 7, both schools agreed to canceled the game completely.
Source: Schedule

Game summaries

College of Idaho

at Colorado

Idaho State

at Northern Arizona

at North Dakota

Montana State

Southern Utah

at Sacramento State

at Montana

Cal Poly

References

Northern Colorado
Northern Colorado Bears football seasons
Northern Colorado Bears football